Benjamin White Norris (January 22, 1819 – January 26, 1873) was a U.S. Representative from Alabama.

Early life and education
Born in Monmouth, Maine, Norris prepared for college at Monmouth Academy, and was graduated from Waterville College (now Colby College), Maine, in 1843.  He taught one term in Kents Hill Seminary.
He engaged in the grocery business in Skowhegan, Maine.  He served as delegate to the Free-Soil Convention at Buffalo in 1848.  He went to California in 1849, remaining one year, then returned to Skowhegan, and studied law.  He was admitted to the bar of Somerset County in January 1852 and commenced practice there.

Political career
Norris served as land agent for the State of Maine 1860-1863, and was a delegate to the Republican National Convention in 1864.  He served as paymaster in the Union Army in 1864 and 1865.  He was appointed major and additional paymaster in the Bureau of Freedmen and Abandoned Lands, serving from May 1 to August 2, 1865, at Mobile, Alabama.

Norris resided on a plantation in Wetumpka, Elmore County until 1872.  He served as member of the constitutional convention of Alabama in 1868.  Upon the readmission of Alabama to representation, he was elected as a Republican to the Fortieth Congress and served from July 21, 1868, to March 3, 1869.  He was an unsuccessful candidate for election in 1870 to the Forty-second Congress.  He also was the 2nd Chairman of The Alabama Republican Party holding the position from 1868-1870.  He died in Montgomery, Alabama, January 26, 1873.  He was interred in South Cemetery, Skowhegan, Maine.

References

External links

 

1819 births
1873 deaths
Maine lawyers
People from Wetumpka, Alabama
Colby College alumni
Alabama Free Soilers
People from Skowhegan, Maine
Republican Party members of the United States House of Representatives from Alabama
19th-century American politicians
People from Monmouth, Maine
19th-century American lawyers